Larry Dean Thompson (born November 15, 1945) is an American lawyer and law professor, most notable for his service as deputy Attorney General of the United States under United States President George W. Bush until August 2003.

Early life and education 
Thompson, the son of a railroad laborer, was born and raised in Hannibal, Missouri. He received his bachelor's degree, graduating cum laude, from Culver-Stockton College in 1967, his master's degree from Michigan State University in 1969, and his Juris Doctor (J.D.) from the University of Michigan in 1974.

In 1970, Thompson married Brenda Anne Taggart. They have two sons.

Corporate career 
Thompson worked as an industrial relations representative for Ford Motor Company during law school. After graduation he worked as an attorney for Monsanto Company in St. Louis until 1977. That year he joined the law firm of King & Spalding in Atlanta, Georgia. He left the firm in 1982 for four years as U.S. attorney for the northern District of Georgia; however, he returned and was made a partner in 1986. He left King & Spalding in 2001 to return to the Justice Department as Deputy Attorney General.

Department of Justice 
From 1982 to 1986, he served as U.S. attorney for the northern District of Georgia, and led the Southeastern Organized Crime Drug Enforcement Task Force. The New York Times describes him as "a moderate" who is "respected by both Democrats and Republicans."

Independent Counsel 
Thompson served as Independent Counsel for the Department of
Housing and Urban Development Investigation from 1995 to 1998, completing the investigation and prosecution started by Judge Arlin Adams in 1990.

Deputy U.S. Attorney General 
In 2001, Thompson was appointed as Deputy U.S. Attorney General by President Bush. At the time of his appointment he was a member of the Federalist Society.

Thompson Memorandum 
In January 2003 Thompson issued an internal Justice Department document informally titled the Thompson Memorandum written to help federal prosecutors decide whether to charge a corporation, rather than or in addition to individuals within the corporation, with criminal offenses. The guidelines were considered tough because they require that to claim cooperation, companies must (1) turn over materials from internal investigations, (2) waive attorney–client privilege, and (3) not provide targeted executive with company-paid lawyers. The guidelines were criticized for, among other things, "seriously eroding" attorney-client privilege. These guidelines were "eased" in December 2006 by Deputy Attorney General Paul J. McNulty who issued a revised version of the memorandum.

Career after the Department of Justice 
In August 2003 Thompson left the Justice Department and was a senior fellow at the Brookings Institution for a year before accepting the position of senior vice-president for government affairs and general counsel at PepsiCo in Purchase, New York. Since 2011, he has served as the John A. Sibley Professor in Corporate and Business Law at the University of Georgia School of Law, where he teaches corporate responsibility and white collar criminal law, and serves on the school’s Dean Rusk International Law Center Council.

Thompson was named in the press as a leading candidate for Attorney General after John Ashcroft resigned on November 9, 2004. Thompson, if selected, would have been the first African-American ever to head the Justice Department. Instead, Alberto Gonzales was selected as Ashcroft's replacement. Later, Thompson's name was mentioned as a possible candidate to replace Supreme Court Justice Sandra Day O'Connor. With the resignation of Gonzales in August 2007, Thompson's name again surfaced a candidate for Attorney General. He supported former New York Mayor Rudy Giuliani in the 2008 presidential election, and the American Bar Association mentioned Thompson again as a possible Attorney General or Supreme Court justice during a potential John McCain administration.

Thompson was named independent corporate monitor overseeing compliance reforms at Volkswagen AG for the next three years by the U.S. government on April 21, 2017.

Thompson has been a member of the Board of Curators for the Georgia Historical Society since 2020.

See also 
 George W. Bush Supreme Court candidates

References

External links 
 

1945 births
African-American business executives
American business executives
African-American lawyers
American prosecutors
George W. Bush administration personnel
Georgia (U.S. state) lawyers
Living people
Michigan State University alumni
Missouri Republicans
PepsiCo people
United States Attorneys for the Northern District of Georgia
United States Deputy Attorneys General
University of Michigan Law School alumni
Federalist Society members